The men's heavyweight boxing competition at the 2016 Olympic Games in Rio de Janeiro was held from 6 to 15 August at the Riocentro.

The final and medal ceremony saw angry crowd reactions after Russia's Evgeny Tishchenko controversially beat Vasily Levit of Kazakhstan on a unanimous judge's decision. The competition had seen the return of judges scoring fighters on their overall performance in each round rather than a punch counting system originally introduced after controversy over judging in the Seoul Olympics.

Schedule 
All times are Brasília Time (UTC−3).

Results

Finals

Top half

Bottom half

References

Boxing at the 2016 Summer Olympics
Men's events at the 2016 Summer Olympics